Zbyněk Ollender (born 12 April 1966) is a retired Czech professional football player.

Club career
Born in Ostrava, Ollender played most of his career for local outfit Baník Ostrava. After spending most of the 1989/1990 season on loan at RH Cheb he returned to Baník only to end his career in Cyprus after a season at SKP Hradec Králové.

He played both legs of Baník's 1990–91 UEFA Cup defeat by Aston Villa and he scored both goals for Baník against Galatasaray in the 1991–92 European Cup Winners' Cup.

Honours
Czechoslovak Cup: 1
 1991

References

1966 births
Living people
Sportspeople from Ostrava
Czech footballers
Czech expatriate footballers
FC Baník Ostrava players
FK Hvězda Cheb players
FC Hradec Králové players
Cypriot First Division players
Expatriate footballers in Cyprus
Czech expatriate sportspeople in Cyprus
Association football forwards